Podjetniško Naselje Kočevje is a settlement above the left bank of the Rinža River, immediately northwest of the town of Kočevje in southern Slovenia. The area is part of the traditional region of Lower Carniola and is now included in the Southeast Slovenia Statistical Region.

History
Podjetniško Naselje Kočevje was created in 2000, when it was administratively separated from Breg pri Kočevju.

References

External links
Podjetniško Naselje Kočevje on Geopedia

Populated places in the Municipality of Kočevje